The Pyramid of Capitalist System is a common name of a 1911 American cartoon caricature critical of capitalism, copied from a Russian flyer of  1901. The graphic focus is on stratification by social class and economic inequality. The work has been described as "famous", "well-known and widely reproduced". A number of derivative works exist.

It was published in the 1911 edition of Industrial Worker (The International Publishing Co., Cleveland, Ohio), a newspaper of the Industrial Workers of the World, and attributed to "Nedeljkovich, Brashich, & Kuharich".

The work is based on older similar pictures. In 1900 the Belgian Labour Party used a picture called "Pyramide à renverser" ("a pyramid that has to be overthrown") during its electoral campaign. A year later Nicolas Lokhoff's 1901 caricature of Imperial Russian society by the Union of Russian Socialists was published. The original picture showed workers supporting the pyramid on their backs, with the stanza: "The time will come when the people in their fury will straighten their bent backs and bring down the structure with one mighty push of their shoulders." Notable differences between the Russian 1901 original and the American 1911 imitation include the replacement of the Russian Empire's black eagle with a money bag, the Russian tsar and tsarina with a more generic trio  monarch and state leaders in suits, two of the three Orthodox clergy with a Catholic cardinal and a Protestant minister, and the Russian Empire army with a more generic group of soldiers; no revolutionary stanza is present. In both pictures, a fallen child or child worker symbolizes the plight of the workers. Another shared element is a red flag raised amongst the workers, symbolizing the emergence of the socialist movement. 

The basic message of the image is a critique of the capitalist system, depicting a hierarchy of power and wealth. It illustrates a working class supporting all others, and if it would withdraw their support from the system it could topple the existing social order. This type of criticism of capitalism is attributed to the French socialist Louis Blanc.

References

External links 

1900 in art
1911 in art
1900 in the Russian Empire
1911 in the United States
Political art
Caricature
Individual printed cartoons
Criticism of capitalism
Economic inequality
Industrial Workers of the World culture
Pyramids
Socialist works